The 2008 Danish Cup Final was the final and deciding match of the 2007-08 Danish Cup. It took place on Thursday, 1 May 2008 at Parken Stadium in Copenhagen. Brøndby IF, the Superliga number 9 of the day, met the then number 8 Esbjerg fB.

Brøndby had won the Cup on five previous occasions (1989, 1994, 1998, 2003, and 2005), while Esbjerg took the trophy in 1964 and 1976, but lost the final in 2006 to Randers FC.

Referee Claus Bo Larsen officiated the match.

Road to Copenhagen

 Both sides entered the competition in its second round.
 Square brackets [ ] represent the opposition's division.

Match details

See also
2007–08 Danish Cup for details of the current competition.

Danish Cup Finals
Danish Cup Final 2008
Danish Cup Final 2008
Cup
May 2008 sports events in Europe
2008 in Copenhagen
Sports competitions in Copenhagen